Artemisia packardiae, also known as Succor Creek mugwort or Packard's wormwood, is a species of North American shrubs in the sunflower family. It grows in the Great Basin region of the western United States, in the States of Nevada, Idaho, and Oregon.

Description
Artemisia packardiae is a strongly aromatic shrub up to 60 cm (25 inches) tall. It has dark green leaves and many small yellow heads. It grows in alkaline flats and coarse talus in desert areas.

References

External links

packardiae
Flora of the Great Basin
Plants described in 1979
Drought-tolerant plants
Flora without expected TNC conservation status